The Maserati Alfieri is a grand tourer from the Italian car manufacturer Maserati. It was shown as a concept car at the 2014 Geneva Motor Show.

Concept


The car is named after Alfieri Maserati (1887–1932), one of the five Maserati Brothers, and marks the 100 year anniversary of the carmaker, which was established in 1914 at Bologna. It was developed at the Centro Stile FCA in Turin. The chief designer was Marco Tencone, while the exterior chief designer was Giovanni Ribotta. The project was managed by Lorenzo Ramaciotti, who has been the director of Centro Stile since 2007 and in 2014 was the head of Fiat-Chrysler Global Design.<ref>IL CONCEPT ALFIERI PROTAGONISTA MASERATI DEL SALONE DELL'AUTO DI GINEVRA, press release from the manufacturing company, dated 4 March 2014.</ref>

The Alfieri'' uses design elements of the Maserati A6 GCS/54 designed by Pininfarina in 1954.

Production version
The Alfieri was confirmed for production in 2016 at a Fiat Chrysler event on 6 May 2014 but was delayed to 2020 at the earliest. The 450-horsepower and 520-horsepower versions were said to only have an all-wheel-drive system.

The Alfieri was reported to be joined by a convertible variant in 2021 after the coupe's introduction. An electric version was planned for 2021 at the earliest.

In June 2018, Maserati announced that the Alfieri would be offered as a plug-in hybrid from 2021 and as an electric vehicle from 2020 with three electric motors and all-wheel-drive. Further, the Alfieri coupe and convertible would replace the Maserati GranTurismo and GranCabrio.

In 2019, it was announced by Maserati's then-executive chairman Harald Wester that the Alfieri would enter mass production in 2021 or 2022. However, as of the Stellantis merger that incorporated FCA in 2021, production is yet to commence. In mid-2021, it was confirmed that a new GranTurismo prototype using styling cues from the Alfieri was being test-driven, with options for an electric drivetrain as well as V6 and V8 engines.

References

External links

 Maserati Alfieri Concept Car - Geneva Auto Show 2014
 Maserati Alfieri
 

Alfieri
Maserati Alfieri